Sir Henry Craik, 1st Baronet,  (18 October 1846 – 16 March 1927) was a Scottish Unionist politician.

He was appointed as a junior examiner of the Committee of Council on Education in 1871 and promoted,  in 1878, to the position of Senior examiner until 1885. In this year Scotland got an independent Committee of Council on Education known as the Scotch Education Department. Craik was appointed as its secretary, a post he held from 1885 to 1904. In October 1901 he received a degree in law (LL.D.) from the University of St Andrews.

He was an elected Member of Parliament (MP) for Glasgow and Aberdeen Universities from 1906 to 1918, and for the Combined Scottish Universities from 1918 until his death in 1927.

He was made a Companion of the Order of the Bath (CB) in 1888, and promoted to Knight Commander (KCB) in 1897. He was made a Privy Councillor in 1918, and in the New Year Honours List 1926, he was made a baronet, of Kennoway, in the County of Fife.

Family 

Craik was born on 18 October 1846 in Glasgow. Son of the Rev. James Craik, D.D., a prominent clergyman and Moderator of the Church of Scotland. He married on 17 December 1873 to Fanny Esther Duffield, daughter of Charles Duffield. They had two children: George Lillie (1874–1929) and Henry Duffield (1876–1955).

Craik died on 16th March 1927 and was buried on the western side of Highgate Cemetery. George succeeded his father in the baronetcy and died two years later. He was succeeded by his brother Henry, who was Governor of the Punjab from 1938 to 1941.

Arms

References

External links 
 
 
 

1846 births
1927 deaths
Burials at Highgate Cemetery
People educated at the High School of Glasgow
Alumni of the University of St Andrews
Unionist Party (Scotland) MPs
Craik, Henry, 1st Baronet
Knights Commander of the Order of the Bath
Members of the Parliament of the United Kingdom for Glasgow and Aberdeen Universities
Members of the Parliament of the United Kingdom for the Combined Scottish Universities
UK MPs 1906–1910
UK MPs 1910
UK MPs 1910–1918
UK MPs 1918–1922
UK MPs 1922–1923
UK MPs 1923–1924
UK MPs 1924–1929
Members of the Privy Council of the United Kingdom
Scottish Tory MPs (pre-1912)
Scottish writers